Hypena modestoides is a species of moth in the family Erebidae. It is found in North America.

The MONA or Hodges number for Hypena modestoides is 8464.

References

Further reading

 
 
 

modestoides
Articles created by Qbugbot
Moths described in 1989